San Isidro Catholic School (also known as SICS or San Isidro) is a Roman Catholic private parochial school located in Pasay, Philippines that offers primary to senior high school education. It was established in 1967 by Msgr. Emmanuel Magtanong Cruz.

Roman Catholic Archdiocese of Manila Educational System
Schools in Pasay
Catholic elementary schools in Metro Manila
Catholic secondary schools in Metro Manila